Inna Mikhailovna Churikova (5 October 1943 – 14 January 2023) was a Soviet and Russian film and theatre actress.

Biography
Churikova was born in Belebey, Bashkir ASSR, Russian SFSR, Soviet Union. In the early 1950s, Inna moved with her mother to Moscow. Inna was bent on becoming an actress from an early age: as a schoolgirl she studied at the drama studio attached to the Stanislavsky Theatre and later, after a few failures, entered Shchepkin Drama School. She debuted in filming whilst a first-year student, in minor episodic roles. Inna Churikova became famous thanks to the films V ogne broda net (No Path Through Fire) (1968), and especially the triumphal Nachalo (The Debut) (1970) by the then beginning film director and her future husband Gleb Panfilov.

Her other most remarkable works were in the films: Tot samyy Myunkhgauzen (The Very Same Munchhausen) (1979) written by Grigory Gorin and directed by Mark Zakharov, Voenno-polevoy roman (Wartime Romance) (1983) by Pyotr Todorovsky, Rebro Adama (Adam's Rib) (1990) by Vyacheslav Krishtofovich, God sobaki (The Year of a Dog) (1993) by Semyon Aranovich, Plashch Kazanovy (Casanova's Raincoat) (1993) by Aleksandr Galin, Kurochka Ryaba (Ryaba My Chicken) (1994) by Andrei Konchalovsky, and Shirli-myrli (What a mess!) (1995) by Vladimir Menshov. For her role in Wartime Romance, she won the Silver Bear for Best Actress at the 34th Berlin International Film Festival, and won the Nika Award in 1991 in the Best Actress category for her role in Rebro Adama.

Churikova was also a renowned stage actress, mainly working in Lenkom Theatre with director Mark Zakharov, as well as a non-repertory theatre star.

Together with her husband and son, Churikova was a co-screenwriter for the historical feature The Romanovs: An Imperial Family (2000), in which rather than appear on screen, she dubs the English actress Lynda Bellingham starring as the tsarina Alexandra Feodorovna.

Churikova died in Moscow on 14 January 2023, at the age of 79.

Filmography
 Clouds over Borsk (Тучи над Борском) (1963) as Raika, Olya's classmate
 Walking the Streets of Moscow (Я шагаю по Москве) (1963) as girl participating in the playful contest
 Jack Frost (Морозко) (1964) as Marfúshka
 Where are you now, Maxim? (Где ты теперь, Максим?) (1964) as Angelica
 Cook (Стряпуха) (1965) as Barbara
 Thirty Three (Тридцать три) (1965) as Rose Lyubashkina
 Head nurse (Старшая сестра) (1966) as Nelly
 The Elusive Avengers (Неуловимые мстители) (1966) as blond Josy
 No Path Through Fire (В огне брода нет) (1967) as Tanya Tetkina
 The Beginning (Начало) (1970) as P`asha Stroganova/Joan of Arc
 Request to speak (Прошу слова) (1967) as Elizabeth A. Uvarovа, chairman of the City Council
 The Very Same Munchhausen (Тот самый Мюнхгаузен) (1979) as Jakobina von Munchhausen
 The Theme (Тема) (1979) as Sasha Nikolaeva, museum guide
 Valentina (Валентина) (1981) as Anna V. Khoroshih, barmaid
 Wartime Romance (Военно-полевой роман)(1983) as Vera
 Vassa (Васса) (1983) as Vassa Zheleznova
 Dead Souls (Мертвые души) (1984) as Lady, nice in every respect
 Courier (Курьер) (1987) as Lydia Alekseevna, Ivan's mother
 Mother (Мать) (1990) as Pelagea Nilovna Vlassova, Pavel's mother
 Adam's Rib (Ребро Адама) (1990) as Nina Elizarovna
 Casanova's Raincoat (Плащ Казановы) (1993) as Chloe
 The Year of the Dog (Год Собаки) (1994) as Vera Morozova
 Assia and the Hen with the Golden Eggs (Курочка Ряба) (1994) as Asya Klyachina
 Shirli-Myrli (Ширли-Мырли) (1995) as Praskoviya Alekseyevna Krolikova
 Bless the Woman (Благословите женщину) (2003) as Kunina
 The Idiot (Идиот) (2003) as Elizaveta Prokof'yevna Yepanchina, general Yepanchin's wife
 Casus belli (Казус белли) (2003) as Masha
 Narrow bridge (Узкий мост) (2004) as Rose Borisovna
 Moscow Saga (Московская сага) (2004) as Mary Gradova
 The First Circle (В круге первом) (2005) as Gerasimovich’s Wife
 Spiral staircase (Винтовая лестница) (2005) as Olga Mikhalovna
 Carnival Night-2, or 50 years later (Карнавальная ночь-2 или 50 лет спустя) (2006) as Inessa
 Guilty Without Fault (Без вины виноватые) (2008) as Helena Kruchinina, a famous actress
 Secrets of Palace Overturns. Part 7. "Vivat, Anna!" (Тайны дворцовых переворотов. Фильм 7. "Виват, Анна!") (2008) as Anna Ioanovna
 Burnt by the Sun 2: Сitadel (Утомленные солнцем 2: Цитадель) (2011) as old woman

Honours and awards
 Order "For Merit to the Fatherland":
1st class (2018)
2nd class (2013)
3rd class (27 July 2007) - for outstanding contribution to the development of theatrical art, and many years of creative activity
4th class (25 August 1997) - a great contribution to the development of theatrical arts
 State Prize of the Russian Federation (1996) - for the role of Arkadina in the play "The Seagull" by Chekhov
 Vasilyev Brothers State Prize of the RSFSR (1985) - for the main role in film "Vassa"
 Lenin Komsomol Prize (1976) - for the creation of images in contemporary cinema
 People's Artist of the USSR (1991)
 People's Artist of the RSFSR (1985)
 Honored Artist of the RSFSR (1977)
 Officer of the Order of Arts and Letters (France, 2010)
Stanislavsky Award (2014)

References

External links

 
 Inna Churikova - Baba Yaga and Joan of Arc

1943 births
2023 deaths
20th-century Russian actresses
21st-century Russian actresses
People from Belebey
Academicians of the National Academy of Motion Picture Arts and Sciences of Russia
Academicians of the Russian Academy of Cinema Arts and Sciences "Nika"
Honorary Members of the Russian Academy of Arts
Honored Artists of the RSFSR
People's Artists of the RSFSR
People's Artists of the USSR
Full Cavaliers of the Order "For Merit to the Fatherland"
Officiers of the Ordre des Arts et des Lettres
Recipients of the Lenin Komsomol Prize
Recipients of the Nika Award
Recipients of the Vasilyev Brothers State Prize of the RSFSR
Silver Bear for Best Actress winners
State Prize of the Russian Federation laureates
Russian film actresses
Russian stage actresses
Russian voice actresses
Soviet film actresses
Soviet stage actresses
Soviet voice actresses